Ližnjan is a village and municipality in Istria, Croatia. It has high biodiversity. There is a small church named Crkva Majke Božje od Kuj that dates back to the 17th century but was built on ancient foundations. It has a glass floor with an ornamental painting underneath. Importantly, the municipality also includes the remains of the ancient city of Nesactium, built by the ancient Histri.

Sport
Ližnjan has a football team named Liznjan. They came first in the 2 league and now they are fighting for progress.

Demographics
The municipality contains 5 villages:
 Jadreški (Giadreschi)
 Ližnjan (Lisignano)
 Muntić (Monticchio)
 Šišan (Sissano)
 Valtura (Altura)

References

External links

Municipalities of Croatia
Populated places in Istria County
Italian-speaking territorial units in Croatia